Nelson Rafael Payano (born November 13, 1982) is a Dominican professional baseball pitcher, who plays for the Sultanes de Monterrey of the Mexican League. He played the 2009 season for the Chunichi Dragons of Nippon Professional Baseball (BPB).

Payano began his professional career in 2003 with the Gulf Coast League Braves. Over the next several years, he moved up through the Atlanta Braves organization, and in 2008, while playing for the double-A Mississippi Braves, he was traded to the Seattle Mariners to complete an earlier deal in which the Braves acquired Greg Norton.

Following the 2008 season, Payano was acquired by the NPB Chunichi Dragons. That season, he appeared in 34 games for the Dragons, winning 2 games and losing 1. After the season ended, Payano was released.

Prior to the 2010 season, Payano was signed to a minor league contract by the Kansas City Royals. He was released during spring training, and was signed by the Houston Astros. He began the season with the Corpus Christi Hooks, but he was released on July 11.

References

External links

Foreign Pitching Statistics from Japan Baseball Daily

1982 births
Living people
Dominican Republic expatriate baseball players in Japan
Nippon Professional Baseball pitchers
Chunichi Dragons players
Gulf Coast Braves players
Danville Braves players
Rome Braves players
Myrtle Beach Pelicans players
Mississippi Braves players
West Tennessee Diamond Jaxx players
Corpus Christi Hooks players